The Hot Springs Railroad Roundhouse is a historic railroad roundhouse at 132 Front Street in Malvern, Arkansas.  Built in 1887, it is the last known surviving substantially intact roundhouse in the state.  It has brick walls and a granite foundation, and houses five stalls.  It was built by the Hot Springs Railroad as a service facility for its locomotives, and was used in that capacity until 1904.  It has since seen use as a warehouse and manufacturing facility.

The building was listed on the National Register of Historic Places in 2003.

See also
National Register of Historic Places listings in Hot Spring County, Arkansas

References

Railway buildings and structures on the National Register of Historic Places in Arkansas
Transport infrastructure completed in 1887
Buildings and structures in Malvern, Arkansas
National Register of Historic Places in Hot Spring County, Arkansas
Railway roundhouses on the National Register of Historic Places
1887 establishments in Arkansas
Transportation in Hot Spring County, Arkansas